Fallen Leaf Lake may be:
Fallen Leaf Lake (Washington)
Fallen Leaf Lake (California)